Chandrakant Shetye is an Indian politician and Ophthalmologist from Goa, India and a member of the Goa Legislative Assembly. Shetye won the Bicholim Assembly constituency as an Independent in the 2022 Goa Legislative Assembly election. He defeated Naresh Sawal of Maharashtrawadi Gomantak Party by 318 votes.

References

1972 births
Living people
Goa MLAs 2022–2027
Independent politicians in India
People from North Goa district